The , officially known as the  was the penultimate tank destroyer developed by the Imperial Japanese Army in 1945, during the closing stages of World War II.

History and development

Towards the end of the Pacific War, Japanese field commanders realized that nothing in the inventory of the Japanese Army would be able to withstand the increasingly advanced tanks and armored vehicles fielded by the Allies, and that a more powerful version of the Type 3 Ho-Ni III was necessary. Development was rushed through on a new design, which was completed in 1945. The Japanese Army immediately issued an order for 200 units to be completed in 1945. However, by that time production was impossible due to material shortages, and by the bombing of Japan in World War II, and testing was not yet completed by the end of the war.

Design

The Type 5 Na-To made use of the chassis and superstructure of the Type 4 Chi-So armored medium tracked carrier. The superstructure had an open top and rear, with an enclosed armored drivers cab. For the Type 5 Na-To there was added a "shielded platform" for its main gun. Its main anti-tank armament consisted of a Type 5 75 mm tank gun, which was the same gun mounted in the Type 4 Chi-To medium tank. The gun was a variant of the Japanese Type 4 75mm AA Gun.

Service record

Although the Type 5 Na-To tank destroyer was intended to become part of the defenses of the Japanese home islands against the projected Allied Invasion, only two units were completed by the surrender of Japan. Neither one was used in combat.

Notes

References

External links
Taki's Imperial Japanese Army Page - Akira Takizawa

Type 5 Na-To
5 Na-To
History of the tank
Mitsubishi
Military vehicles introduced from 1945 to 1949